Amy Renee Mihaljevic (December 11, 1978 –  October 27, 1989) was a ten-year-old American elementary school student who was kidnapped and murdered in the U.S. state of Ohio in 1989. Her murder case received national attention. The story of her unsolved kidnapping and murder were presented by John Walsh on the television show America's Most Wanted during the program's early years. To date, her killer has not been found, yet the case remains active; new information in 2007 and 2013 has increased hopes of resolving the case. In February 2021, it was announced that a person of interest emerged in the case after a woman contacted authorities in 2019 with potentially valuable information.

Disappearance and murder 
On October 27, 1989, Amy Mihaljevic was kidnapped from the Bay Square Shopping Center in Bay Village, Ohio, a suburb of Cleveland. The abductor had contacted Mihaljevic by telephone and arranged to meet her on the pretext of buying a gift for her mother because she had recently been promoted, as he told her. On February 8, 1990, the girl's body was found in a field, close to the road, off County Road 1181, Ruggles Township in rural Ashland County, Ohio.

Evidence found at the scene of the crime suggests that Mihaljevic's body was probably dumped there shortly after her abduction. Based on findings by the Cuyahoga County coroner, Mihaljevic's last meal was some sort of soy substance, possibly an artificial chicken product or Chinese food. Other evidence includes the presence of yellow/gold colored fibers on her body. It appears her killer also took several souvenirs including the girl's horse-riding boots, her denim backpack, a binder with "Buick, Best in Class" written on the front clasp, and turquoise earrings in the shape of horse heads. Blood believed to be that of Mihaljevic was found in her underwear, indicating she may have been raped or sexually abused. Mitochondrial DNA from the crime scene was sampled, which may be used in the future to compare to suspects.

Investigation

The Bay Village Police and the FBI conducted an extensive investigation into her disappearance and murder. The case generated thousands of leads. Dozens of suspects were asked to take lie-detector tests, but no one has ever been charged with the crime. Law enforcement continues to pursue leads and monitor suspects to the present day. 20,000 interviews have taken place during the investigation. This was described to be the biggest search in Ohio since the 1951 disappearance of Beverly Potts.

In November 2006, it was revealed that several other young girls had received phone calls similar to the ones Mihaljevic received in the weeks prior to her abduction. The unknown male caller claimed that he worked with the girl’s mother and wanted help buying a present to celebrate her promotion. The girls who received these calls lived in North Olmsted, a suburb near Bay Village; some had unlisted phone numbers. This new information was considered significant by investigators. Mihaljevic and the others who received such calls had all visited the local Lake Erie Nature and Science Center, which had a visitors' logbook by the front door. The girls may have signed the book and added personal information including phone numbers and addresses.

Bay Village police collected DNA samples from several potential suspects in the case in December 2006. As of early 2007, it was reported that a longtime suspect in the case had retained legal counsel.

In late 2013, investigator Phil Torsney returned from retirement to work on the case, to which he had been originally assigned after the murder. Torsney is well known for aiding in the capture of Whitey Bulger, who was a long-time member of the FBI Top Ten Most Wanted. Torsney stated that he believed that Mihaljevic was transported out of Bay Village after she was kidnapped, as the town is "too dense, too close-knit, to be a likely place to commit murder." However, he stated that the murder likely took place in Ashland County, which the murderer was probably familiar with.

The FBI announced in March 2014 that a $25,000 reward is available to anyone who can provide information that leads to the arrest and conviction of the killer of Mihaljevic. In October, it was increased to $27,000.

In 2016, it was discovered that a blanket and curtain located near Mihaljevic's body had hairs on them similar to the Mihaljevics' dog. They were possibly used to conceal the victim's body before she was left in the field.

In 2018, investigators were also following a potential link between identity thief Robert Ivan Nichols (alias Joseph Newton Chandler III) and the  murder of Mihaljevic. In 2019, authorities stated that they have extensively investigated all suspects in the case and feel that if her killer were identified, he would likely be a part of their list.

2021 case update 

On the 31st anniversary of the discovery of Mihaljevic's remains, a major development in the case was announced. A publicly unidentified man, age 64, was implicated by a former girlfriend, with whom he was involved at the time of the kidnapping and murder. She alleged that he was uncharacteristically absent from their residence, located in close proximity to the abduction site, when the victim disappeared. The man called her late that evening, inquiring if she had seen media releases about the abduction. He was employed in the same city, and his niece was in the same grade as Mihaljevic. 

Police interviews with the man included "suspicious statements", including the possibility he had met Amy Mihaljevic's mother, Margaret, before. His DNA was obtained without protest, and he later failed a polygraph test. A warrant to search a storage facility led to authorities confiscating certain items of interest.

Additionally, the two individuals who witnessed the yet-to-be-identified kidnapper lead Mihaljevic into his vehicle identified the potential suspect out of line-ups conducted in May 2020. The vehicle itself was consistent with what the man drove at the time, including the fact that its carpeting was similar in coloration to the fibers on Mihaljevic's body. A vehicle of the same make and model had been observed near the body's dumpsite on February 8, 1990, when the victim's body was recovered along a roadside.

Aftermath
In response to her daughter's death, Mihaljevic's mother, Margaret McNulty, co-founded a foundation to protect children from such situations that happened to Amy. McNulty also suffered from lupus after the death of Amy, resulting in her death at age 54 in 2001.

See also
List of solved missing person cases

References

Further reading
 Renner, James (2008). The Serial Killer's Apprentice: And 12 Other True Stories of Cleveland's Most Intriguing Unsolved Crimes. Cleveland, OH: Gray & Company, Publishers. 
 Renner, James (2006). Amy: My Search for Her Killer: Secrets & Suspects in the Unsolved Murder of Amy Mihaljevic. Cleveland, Ohio: Gray & Co. .
 Ressler, Robert; Schactman, Tom (1992). Whoever Fights Monsters: My Twenty Years Hunting Serial Killers for the FBI. St. Martin's Press.

External links 
FBI reward offer, March 11, 2014
Video documenting the Amy Mihaljevic case
Updates on the investigation 
News segments on Youtube
2018 podcast on the Mihaljevic case

1989 murders in the United States
1989 in Ohio
October 1989 events in the United States
October 1989 crimes
Child sexual abuse in the United States
Crime in Ohio
Formerly missing people
Missing person cases in Ohio
Deaths by stabbing in the United States
Murder in Ohio
Unsolved murders in the United States
Incidents of violence against girls
Murdered American children
Female murder victims